Yunnanilus macrositanus is a species of stone loach endemic to China. The specific name is spelled macroistainus in Fishbase but as first reviser Maurice Kottelat chose to use macrositanus and this has been followed by the Catalog of Fishes. The type locality of this species is in Lunan County, Heilongtan, Yunnan.

References 

M
Freshwater fish of China
Endemic fauna of China
Taxa named by Li Wie-Xian
Fish described in 1999